Super Spy is an American comedy film written, produced and directed by A.J. Jamal and starring A.J. Jamal, LisaRaye, Reynaldo Rey, Conchita Leeflang.

Premise
An aspiring screenwriter is determined to make a low budget action film.  While filming it, he films a crime being committed and is then hunted down by a band of criminals.

References

External links

2004 films
2004 comedy films
2000s English-language films